Richardson Houses Historic District is a national historic district located at Reidsville, Rockingham County, North Carolina. It encompasses 17 contributing buildings and 2 contributing structures in a residential section of Reidsville.  It was developed between about 1840 and 1912, and includes notable examples of Italianate, Greek Revival, and Classical Revival style architecture.  The three principal buildings in the district are the Robert Payne Richardson House I (c. 1842), the Robert Payne Richardson House II, North Belmont (c. 1860), and the Robert Payne Richardson House III, Belmont (1912).

It was listed on the National Register of Historic Places in 1986.

References

Historic districts on the National Register of Historic Places in North Carolina
Neoclassical architecture in North Carolina
Italianate architecture in North Carolina
Greek Revival houses in North Carolina
Houses in Rockingham County, North Carolina
National Register of Historic Places in Rockingham County, North Carolina
1986 establishments in North Carolina